Constitution of the Russian SFSR may refer to:

1918 Soviet Constitution
1925 Constitution of the Russian SFSR
1937 Constitution of the Russian SFSR
1978 Constitution of the Russian SFSR

Russian Soviet Federative Socialist Republic